Stonewall, Virginia may refer to:
Stonewall, Alleghany County, Virginia
Stonewall, Appomattox County, Virginia